Wu Pao-chun (born 5 September 1970) is a Taiwanese  baker best known for winning the title of Master Baker in the bread category of the 2010 Bakery Masters competition held in Paris. Wu is also known for a rose-lychee bread he created which includes Taiwanese ingredients such as millet wine, rose petals and dried lychees.

Biography
Wu was born in Pingtung County, Taiwan, and he grew up in an impoverished single-parent family as the youngest of eight children. In 2016, he obtained an EMBA degree from the National University of Singapore.

References

External links

 

1970 births
Living people
Bakers
People from Pingtung County